Bala Abdulkadir Mohammed (born 5 October 1958) is Nigerian politician who is the Governor of Bauchi State. Prior to becoming governor of Bauchi State, he was Minister of Federal Capital Territory from 2010 to 2015; and a Senator from Bauchi State between 2007 and 2010. He is a ranking member of the opposition People's Democratic Party (PDP).He began his civil service experience as an administrative officer at the Federal Ministry of Internal Affairs where he served until 1994 when he moved over to the Presidency [Cabinet Secretariat] as the Principal Administration Officer. Bala Mohammed's rise through the civil service ranks was rapid. Between 1995 and 2005, he rose being the Chief Supplies Officer at the federal Ministry of Solid Minerals - to assistant director at the Federal Ministry of Power and Steel – to Deputy Director/SA to Honorable Minister at the Federal Ministry of Transport – to Director of Administration at the Nigerian Railway Corporations – to Special Assistant to the Honorable Minister of Aviation – to Director of Administration and Supplies at the Nigerian Meteorological Agency. He voluntarily retired from civil service at the level of a director and joined politics.

Education
He began his educational career in 1965 at Duguri primary school, Bauchi where he graduated in 1971 with a first leaving certificate from 1972 to 1976, he attended Government School Bauchi where he obtained WAEC. He obtained his advanced level testimonial in 1979 from North East College of Art and Science. He obtained Bachelor of Arts degree from University of Maiduguri.

Politics
He reportedly fell out with political godfather Governor Isa Yuguda after Yuguda married President Umaru Yar'Adua's daughter and decamped to the People's Democratic Party (PDP). Following the death of Umaru Yar'Adua, Mohammed joined the Peoples Democratic Party (PDP) and became a close associate of President Goodluck Jonathan.

Senator
In 2007, Bala Mohammed contested and won the election to serve the people of South Senatorial zone in Bauchi State at the capacity of a senator under the party platform of the All Nigeria Peoples Party [ANPP]. He served as the Senator from 2007 to 2010. While at the senate chamber, he became one of the foremost outspoken legislators in Nigeria. Bala Mohammed sat as member of eight [8] Committees – he was the Vice Chairman Senate Committee on Aviation, Secretary, Northern Senator's Forum. The committees included Communication, Finance, Public Account, Rules and Business, Environment, Labor and Productivity.

Doctrine of Necessity: February 10, 2010, saw Senator Bala Mohammed at his natural state when he courageously called and intensely promoted the Doctrine of Necessity in the Senate that birthed the emergence of the then Vice President Goodluck Jonathan as the Acting President.  Senator Bala Mohammed's actions paved the way for Goodluck Jonathan, the unassuming scholar from the Niger Delta, to break the glass ceiling of Nigeria's tripodal political monopoly.

Minister of federal capital territory
On April 6, 2010, Senator Bala Mohammed became the Minister of the Federal Capital Territory [FCT]. He left the ANPP for the PDP shortly after. While at the FCT, he brought extensive reforms. Among the reforms were the sanitization of the land administration of the FCT, comprehensive expansion of the major road access Nnamdi Azikiwe Airport road to the International Airport in Abuja, the construction of the Kubwa expressway, the rail track from Abuja to Kaduna, and the Idu rail station. He also introduced the land swap policy where land was used as a resource to fast track infrastructural development in the FCT.

The Bala Mohammed FCT administration oversaw the installation of solar panel traffic lights. Other projects executed include the aggressive development of satellite towns, the completion of the Usama Dam Water project. Also, his administration instituted innovations that served as bedrock of financial stability and employment opportunities – such as the FCT Internal Revenue Board, the Outdoor Advertising [Signage] Agency and the FCTA Emergency Services.

Struggles:  Shortly following the exit of Senator Bala Mohammed from the seat of Minister to the FCT in May 2015 – and the entry of a new ruling party at the Presidential villa in Aso Rock, Abuja, the antigraft agencies began its clampdown on the former minister of the FCT3.  In October 2016, the Economic and Financial Crimes Commission [EFCC] arrested Senator Bala Mohammed and detained him for 49 days. An Abuja High Court sitting at Maitama declared the detention as illegal and unconstitutional and consequently ordered the EFCC to pay the sum of N5million as compensation4. Senator Bala Mohammed made clear that his travails were “a clear case of witch hunt aimed at tarnishing his image and hard-earned reputation.”

“For the fact that I am being questioned by the EFCC doesn’t make me guilty and will not stop my aspiration because I know that I have not committed any crime until it is proved otherwise in the court of competent jurisdiction.” – declared Senator Bala Mohammed as he pointed to the EFCC's corruption case against him as mere political witch hunt – attributable to the role he played in the execution of the Doctrine of Necessity.

Governor of Bauchi State 
Senator Bala Mohammed, on May 29, 2019, was sworn in as the Governor of Bauchi State under the party banner of the Peoples Democratic Party having defeated the incumbent Governor, Mohammed Abdullahi Abubakar 515,313 to 500,625 votes. The victory was later upheld by the Supreme Court on January 20, 20205.  

Bala Mohammed's travails with the Nigerian antigraft after his electoral victory as the governor elect of Bauchi State is attributed to the then outgoing Governor of Bauchi State, Mohammed Abubakar.

According to published reports, he was “the arrow head spearheading the sudden EFCC interest in the Governor Elect. It is recalled that the outgoing Governor of Bauchi State had been exposed numerously by reputable media outlets for having an incestuous relationship with agents of the EFCC – to the extent that virtually all petitions sent to the EFCC against the Abubakar administration never saw the light of day. They died a natural death”

Bala Mohammed's remarks to the continued harassment by the EFCC sums up the situation. “It is completely politically-motivated but I believe in justice and that was why I went to the court of justice. Definitely! Because of the evidence that we have, he is going to be thoroughly probed because I have not been spared by the Federal Government. I have been under probe by the EFCC and because I believe in accountability and was influential in the government of President Goodluck Jonathan, I chose not to run away.”

Achievements in Office 

Immediately, the newly sworn in Governor took to the task of sanitizing the Government of Bauchi State. He sought to streamline government processes and protocols and to recover lost and/or stolen government properties including monies. He also launched the exercise to rid the Bauchi State civil service of ghost workers.

As Bala Mohammed arrived the seat of Governor, he met a Bauchi State that had been poorly managed. Over 1.3million children were reported to be out of school, jobless youths roamed the streets, non- functional hospitals and local government areas that have totally collapsed, while the former governor and his cohorts fed their greed and perfidy.

“The Bala Mohammed administration was quick to grab the bull by the horns without allowing for the precious time to waste away. He delved into the nitty-gritty to set the committee task force for the recovery of lost and stolen government properties and monies. A committee populated by persons from across party lines. The committee task force was able to discover and recover billions of naira to the state – monies that the Governor put to work immediately by reinvesting into the State by erecting lasting infrastructures such as roads [international standards], schools, water treatment plant, hospital upgrades and refurbishment, agriculture/farming, power and water supply to rural communities, and other critical sectors of the State.”

Bala Mohammed acted to begin the sanitization exercise by setting up a committee on Bank Verification Number (BVN) and authentication of civil servants on its payroll. The exercise immediately netted gains for the Bauchi people. This is as the Bauchi State Government removed 1115 employees from the payroll and saved N763,792,664.007. The committee which received a total of 279 petitions, complaints and whistle blower exposés, federal allocations, local and international loans, aids, grants, donations and other interventions, from primary and secondary sources – discovered the administrations of Isa Yuguda and Mohammed Abubakar had looted state owned properties and monies valued in the hundreds of billions.

Revamping Healthcare: The Bala Mohammed administration in Bauchi State launched a major campaign to revamp and upgrade the healthcare delivery systems in the State. His administration began with healthcare infrastructure. Within the first two years, 323 primary healthcare centers were either constructed, renovated, upgraded and fully equipped across the rural communities under the BASG/NSHIP program. Within the same two-year period, the Bala Mohammed administration constructed, renovated, upgraded and fully equipped secondary healthcare centers such as the General Hospitals located across the various local government areas [LGAs] – ranging from construction of new General Hospital at Warji, Warji LGA, construction of new General Hospital at Dambam, Dambam LGA, construction of new cottage at Yelwan Duguri, and others spread across the LGAs of Bauchi State.

Revolution in Road Construction: In his three years as the Governor of Bauchi State, Bala Mohammed has constructed over 250 km – and has already began the process of constructing more roads into the rural communities and farmlands. Ongoing road construction of Burga to Yalwan – Duguri to Yashi is 68.4 km. It links Tafawa Balewa LGA and Alkaleri LGA. Itas to Gadau road is 24.5 km. Bulkachuwa to Udubo road is 36 km abandoned by Mohammed Abubakar, the former governor. Udubo to Gamawa road is 25 km, a federal road being renovated by Bala Mohammed administration. It was also abandoned by Mohammed Abubakar. Bisina township road is 3.8 km – its a town in Katagum senatorial zone. Sade township road is 2.8 km. Sade to Akuyam town is 16.8 km. Bununu township road is 2.8 km. Within the capital city – dualization of Kano road – from Awalah roundabout to airport – 22 km. Dualization of Maiduguri road from Awalah roundabout to Bauchi university in Yuli campus – 14 km. Dualization of Jos road from Total filling station in Bauchi metropolis to Dungal village about 12 km. Newly constructed road commissioned by President Jonathan is 6.4 km in Bauchi metropolis named after Goodluck E. Jonathan. Total renovation of Adamu Jumba road about 1 km. Another road – Ibrahim bako estate road commissioned by Abubakar Atiku – and named after him – 4.8km9.

To ensure no projects are left abandoned, Bala Mohammed's administration approved completing four major road construction projects which were initiated but abandoned by the previous administration: Mararrabar Ganye – Gwalfada road in Toro LGA, Darazo – Gafchiyari road in Darazo LGA, Giade Juguda – Kurda – Gulka road in Giade LGA, and Dass – Gajiwal – Bangim – Falantulu – Bununu in Dass & Tafawa Balewa LGAs. Work has already commenced.

Governance Through Empowerment Programs:  The Bala Mohammed administration under the auspices of the Kaura Economic and Empowerment formally launched the most successful and sustainable empowerment program in the history of Bauch State. Some of the fruits of the program include the distribution of 156 commercial buses across the 20 LGAs, distribution of 1,500 tricycles, set up a micro grant of N10,000 each petty trader [woman] and funded the micro grant scheme with N200million, launched a N75million KEEP initiatives per LGA for youths and women, another sum of N500m reserved for soft loans to traders and artisans.

Upgrading Education: It is understood, the Governor values education, especially child education. He views child education as a right owed by the government. For this reason, he made education one of his priority agenda. So far, his government has spent over N8billion on education, and has also approved payment of NABTEB exams fees for all the 1,751 SS3 students of Government Technical Colleges along with all the 499 students sitting for NBAIS exams for Government Arabic Colleges.

Farming: In terms of farming, the Bala Mohammed administration had also prioritized agriculture as one of its valued agenda. Within the last two years, it procured over 4,000 metric tons of fertilizer for Bauchi State farmers and has sponsored 1000 students for training on better farming mechanisms. Over 5000 farmers were recipients of the fertilizers.

Housing: In the same spirit of upgrading the lives of the people of Bauchi to acceptable levels of living, the Governor embarked on a 1,500 Housing Estate at Dungal. This is in addition to the ongoing construction of the Bauchi Hajj Camp. His administration has sunk 1046 solar powered and handpump boreholes across the State. The upgrade of the Gubi Dam Water Treatment Plant and the Water Reservoir, near Zaranda Hotel – are both projects that have neared completion.

See also
List of Governors of Bauchi State

References

1958 births
Living people
Nigerian Muslims
Ministers of the Federal Capital Territory (Nigeria)
Federal ministers of Nigeria
Members of the Senate (Nigeria)
All Nigeria Peoples Party politicians
Peoples Democratic Party (Nigeria) politicians
University of Maiduguri alumni
People from Bauchi State
21st-century Nigerian politicians